The Innocent is a 1993 drama film directed by John Schlesinger. The screenplay was written by Ian McEwan and based on his 1990 novel of the same name. The film stars Anthony Hopkins, Isabella Rossellini, and Campbell Scott. It was released in the USA in 1995.

Plot
The film takes place in 1950s Berlin at the height of the Cold War and centres around the joint CIA/MI6 real-life Operation Gold: building a tunnel under the Russian sector of Berlin.

Cast
Anthony Hopkins as Bob Glass
Isabella Rossellini as Maria 
Campbell Scott as Leonard Markham
Ronald Nitschke as Otto
Hart Bochner as Russell
James Grant as Macnamee
Jeremy Sinden as Captain Lofting 
Richard Durden as Black
Corey Johnson as Lou
Richard Good as Piper

Release and reception
The movie spent 12 months in studio quarantine, and was released domestically in September 1995 without advance screenings for critics. In The New York Times, film critic Caryn James wrote, "It's not a good omen for 'The Innocent' that the prototypical Yank turns out to be Anthony Hopkins, the shy Englishman Leonard is played by the American Campbell Scott and the German woman who intrigues them is Isabella Rossellini... But The Innocent, which has been on the shelf for at least a year and was dumped in theaters yesterday without advance screenings, eventually overcomes its obstacles and almost lives up to its promising pedigree. You can trust Ian McEwan, who wrote the screenplay from his 1990 novel, to turn this fraught political situation into a dark, paranoid love story. And you can count on the director John Schlesinger (whose most famous film is Midnight Cowboy and most recent is the efficient thriller Pacific Heights) to bring it to life with a commanding sense of its increasingly complex elements. What begins as a low-key tale of espionage, with allies spying on each other and everybody's motives in doubt, becomes a tense and suspenseful love story with Hitchcockian overtones."

Rita Kempley in The Washington Post, on the other hand, called the movie "baffling." She continued, "The acting proves as inconsistent as Schlesinger's ability to build and release suspense. In full swagger, Hopkins seems to be doing Teddy Roosevelt in preparation for the title role in Nixon. Rossellini recalls her mother, Ingrid Bergman, in an airport farewell scene that echoes Casablanca. It doesn't detract from the actress's work, but it does invite negative comparisons. Talk about amounting to a hill of beans."

Upon its September 1995 USA release, Stephen Hunter wrote: "What an odd, chilly cup of tea is John Schlesinger's The Innocent. It slipped into the Greenspring with a great cast–Anthony Hopkins, Campbell Scott and Isabella Rossellini–but without benefit of a screening, a commercial decision that seemed foolish at the time but now seems the quintessence of marketing wisdom. The movie turns out to be a spy thriller set in the Berlin of the '50s. But just about every note is brightly, noisily false. In fact, the movie is so wrong from start to finish it's some kind of monument to human folly... It becomes a lame, bad parody of Casablanca, complete with airport, twin-engine prop plane, raincoats and Ingrid Bergman, or at least a facsimile thereof in the shape of her daughter, Rossellini. Why Rossellini would agree to such a tasteless twist on her mother in such an otherwise undistinguished film is one of the great astonishments of our time; why the great director of Sunday, Bloody Sunday and Darling would consider it himself is another."

References

External links

 
 
 

1993 films
1990s American films
1990s British films
1990s English-language films
1990s thriller films
American spy films
British spy films
Cold War spy films
Films about the Berlin Wall
Films about the Central Intelligence Agency
Films based on British novels
Films directed by John Schlesinger
Films set in Berlin
Films set in West Germany
Films shot in Germany